Charles Howard, 3rd Earl of Nottingham (25 December 1610 – 26 April 1681) was the son of Charles Howard, 1st Earl of Nottingham by his second wife, the former Margaret Stuart. He studied at the University of Oxford, where he had a reputation for exceptional wildness, and he damaged his prospects by an impulsive love marriage to a barrister's daughter, a marriage which both families disapproved of.

He inherited the earldom following the death of his half-brother, Charles Howard, 2nd Earl of Nottingham. He was married around 1627 to Arabella Smith, "a lady of surpassing beauty and charm", the daughter of Edward Smith, a barrister, and sister of Sir Edward Smith, Chief Justice of the Irish Common Pleas. They had no children.

When he died, the Earldom of Nottingham became extinct, but the Barony was succeeded by Francis Howard, 5th Baron Howard of Effingham.

References

1610 births
1681 deaths
17th-century English nobility
63
Charles Howard, 03rd Earl of Nottingham
People educated at Whitgift School
Barons Howard of Effingham